"Someday Never Comes" is a song by Creedence Clearwater Revival from their album Mardi Gras released in 1972 and written by the frontman John Fogerty. The single reached #25 on the US Billboard Hot 100 chart in June 1972 with Doug Clifford's "Tearin' up the Country" released as the B-side. This is the final single released by Creedence Clearwater Revival before they officially broke up in 1972.

Song meaning
Fogerty stated in 2013 that the song is about his parents' and his own divorce:

References

1972 singles
Creedence Clearwater Revival songs
Songs written by John Fogerty
Song recordings produced by John Fogerty
1972 songs
Fantasy Records singles
Songs about divorce